The Tatanagar–Danapur Express is an Express train belonging to South Eastern Railway zone that runs between  and  in India. It is currently being operated with 18183/18184 train numbers on daily basis.

Service

The 18183/Tatanagar–Danapur Super Express has an average speed of 45 km/hr and covers 506 km in 11h 15m. The 18184/Danapur–Tatanagar Super Express has an average speed of 44 km/hr and covers 506 km in 11h 29m.

Train schedule
From Tatanagar Jn to Danapur - 18183. The train starts from Tatanagar Jn everyday.

Note : Train reverses it's direction at Asansol Junction.

From Danapur to Tatanagar Jn - 18184. The train starts from Danapur everyday.

Note : Train reverses it's direction at Asansol Junction.

Coach composition

The train has 2 LHB rakes with a max speed of 130 kmph. The train consists of 16 coaches:

 2 AC Three Tier
 2 AC Chair Car
 4 Reserved Second Sitting
 6 Unreserved Second Sitting
 1 Seating cum Luggage Rake
1 Generator Car

Traction

Both trains are hauled by a Tatanagar Loco Shed-based WAP-7 electric locomotive from Tatanagar to Asansol. From Asansol trains are hauled by a Gomoh/Barauni/Samastipur-based WAP-7 electric locomotive uptil Danapur and vice versa.

Direction reversal

The train reverses its direction 1 times:

See also 

 Tatanagar Junction railway station
 Danapur railway station

Notes

References

External links 

 18183/Tatanagar–Danapur Super Express India Rail Info
 18184/Danapur–Tatanagar Super Express India Rail Info

Transport in Jamshedpur
Transport in Patna
Express trains in India
Rail transport in West Bengal
Rail transport in Jharkhand
Rail transport in Bihar